Abigail Dow (born 29 September 1997, Slough) is an English rugby player. She is a member of the England women's national rugby team and a  winger for Harlequins Women at club level.

International career 
Dow made her England debut in the 2017 Old Mutual Wealth Series against Canada women's national rugby union team, where she scored five tries in her first two appearances.

During the 2018 Women's Six Nations Championship, she started three of England's matches and scored three tries. England finished in second place.

She featured once during the 2019 Women's Six Nations Championship, scoring a try as England defeated Wales. England went on to win the grand slam.

She played again for England in the 2020 Women's Six Nations Championship, scoring four tries in three matches and becoming a Grand Slam winner for the second time. In 2020, she was awarded a professional contract with the England Women's Rugby team.

In February 2021 she was considered England’s first choice full back. She missed the first match of the 2021 Women's Six Nations Championship due to a family bereavement, but returned for England's 67-3 win over Italy where she scored two of England's nine tries. England won the championship outright, with Dow scoring ten points for the team across the course of the tournament. She was named in the England squad for the delayed 2021 Rugby World Cup held in New Zealand in October and November 2022. She suffered a head injury in the final, due to a high tackle.

Club career 
In 2016, Dow joined Wasps Ladies, where she continues to play as a right wing. She was given a professional contract with the club in 2020.

Early life and education 
Dow started playing rugby at about five years old. Her dad, Paul Dow, coached at Maidenhead Rugby club so she started out there, later moving to Reading to play for the girls' team. Her sister, Ruth, also played for Reading. Both sisters were chosen for the England South West Women’s rugby sevens side. Ruth played flanker and played in the Premiership for Wasps and for England U20s before injury curtailed her career.

Dow's brother, Chris Dow, also played for Maidenhead.

In January 2021, Dow completed a Masters in Mechanical Engineering at Imperial College London, where she achieved first class honours.

She was a swimmer until the age of 16 when she decided to focus on rugby.

References

1997 births
Living people
England women's international rugby union players
English female rugby union players
Rugby union players from Slough
Rugby union wings
Wasps Women rugby players